Kamenné Kosihy is a village and municipality in the Veľký Krtíš District of the Banská Bystrica Region of southern Slovakia.

Etymology
The village was named after the Magyar tribe Keszi.

Genealogical resources
The records for genealogical research are available at the state archive "Statny Archiv in Banska Bystrica, Slovakia"

 Roman Catholic church records (births/marriages/deaths): 1735-1904 (parish A)
 Lutheran church records (births/marriages/deaths): 1721-1862 (parish B)

See also
 List of municipalities and towns in Slovakia

References

External links
Statistical Office of the Slovak republic
Surnames of living people in Kamenne Kosihy

Villages and municipalities in Veľký Krtíš District